Beyond Words is a 2017 Dutch-Polish drama film directed by Urszula Antoniak. It was screened in the Contemporary World Cinema section at the 2017 Toronto International Film Festival.

Cast
 Jakub Gierszał as Michael
 Andrzej Chyra as Stanislaw
 Christian Löber as Franz
 Justyna Wasilewska

References

External links
 

2017 films
2017 drama films
Dutch drama films
Polish drama films
2010s Polish-language films